Moccasin Springs is an unincorporated community in Cape Girardeau County, in the U.S. state of Missouri.

History
A post office called Moccasin Springs was established in 1903, and remained in operation until 1909. The community was so named on account of water moccasins at a nearby springs.

References

Unincorporated communities in Cape Girardeau County, Missouri
Unincorporated communities in Missouri